Greatorex may refer to:

Clement Greatorex (1869–1937), Royal Navy admiral
Eleanor Greatorex (1854–1917), American painter and illustrator
Eliza Pratt Greatorex (1819–1897), American artist
Henry Wellington Greatorex (1816–1858), English-American composer
Jonathan Greatorex (born 1970), English music educator and consumer advocate
Ken Greatorex (born 1936), English rugby league footballer
Louis Greatorex (born 1996), English actor
Ralph Greatorex (c.1625–1675), English mathematical instrument maker
Ted Greatorex (1901–1964), Australian rugby union player
Theophilus Greatorex (1864–1933), English cricketer
Thomas Greatorex (1758–1831), English composer, astronomer and mathematician
Valentine Greatrakes or Greatorex (1628–1683), Irish faith healer
Walter Greatorex (1877–1949), English composer
Wilfred Greatorex (1922–2002), English television and film writer

See also
Greatrex
Greatrakes
Electoral division of Greatorex, Northern Territory, Australia